John Relyea (born 1972 in Toronto) is a Canadian bass-baritone opera singer and winner of the 2003 Richard Tucker Award.

He was born in 1972 in Toronto, Ontario, Canada, to Gary Relyea, one of Canada's well-known opera singers, and a native Estonian Anna Tamm-Relyea, also a professional singer.

Relyea is a 1998 graduate of the Curtis Institute of Music in Philadelphia. He studied with his father, with renowned opera bass Jerome Hines, and with bass-baritone Edward Zambara. John Relyea has performed with major symphony companies across the country, such as the New York Philharmonic, Santa Fe Opera, Seattle Opera and the Metropolitan Opera in addition to the Swedish Radio Symphony Orchestra.

His roles include Figaro in Le Nozze di Figaro, the four villains in The Tales of Hoffmann, Raimondo in Lucia di Lammermoor, Giorgio in I Puritani, Escamillo in Carmen, Don Basilio in Il barbiere di Siviglia, Colline in La Bohème, Marke in Tristan und Isolde, Caspar in Der Freischütz, Banquo in Macbeth, Collatinus in The Rape of Lucretia, Garibaldo in Rodelinda, Publio in La Clemenza di Tito, Mephistopheles in La damnation de Faust, Gessler in Guillaume Tell, and Vodnik in Rusalka with Renée Fleming as his daughter and appears on the Metropolitan Opera's DVD presentations of Don Giovanni and Die Meistersinger von Nürnberg, both released by Deutsche Grammophon

Relyea is married with two sons. He resides in Rhode Island.

References

External links
John Relyea
FanFaire (copy archived April 2008)

1972 births
Living people
Date of birth missing (living people)
21st-century Canadian male opera singers
Operatic bass-baritones
Operatic basses
Canadian people of Estonian descent
Richard Tucker Award winners
Musicians from Toronto
Curtis Institute of Music alumni